All Saints' Day is a Christian holiday.

All Saints, All Saints Day or Feast of All Saints may also refer to:

Art and entertainment
 All Saints (group), an English-Canadian girl group
 All Saints (All Saints album)
 All Saints (David Bowie album)
 "All Saints" (David Bowie song)
 All Saints Records, a British record label
 "All St. Day", a song by ...And You Will Know Us by the Trail of Dead from The Secret of Elena's Tomb
 All Saints (TV series), an Australian hospital drama
 The Boondock Saints II: All Saints Day, a 2009 film
 The Feast of All Saints (novel), a 1979 novel by Anne Rice
 All Saints (film), a 2017 Christian drama film

Places
 All Saints, Devon, a civil parish in Devon, England
 All Saints, Wolverhampton, an inner city area of Wolverhampton, West Midlands, England
 All Saints (Kettering BC Ward), an electoral ward in Northamptonshire, England
 Allhallows, Kent, a village in Kent, England, named after its church
 All Saints DLR station, a railway station in East London, England
 All Saints, Antigua and Barbuda, a town on the island of Antigua
 All Saints Estate Winery, a winery in Victoria, Australia

Schools
 All Saints Academy (disambiguation)
 All Saints Catholic School (disambiguation)
 All Saints College (disambiguation)
 All Saints High School (disambiguation)
 All Saints University (disambiguation)

Australia
 All Saints Anglican School in Gold Coast, Queensland

Canada 
 All Saints Catholic Secondary School, Whitby, Ontario
 All Saints Catholic Elementary School, Markham, Ontario

Sports
 All Saints GAC, a Gaelic Athletic Association football club

See also
 All Saints Church (disambiguation)
 AllSaints, a British high street retailer
 All Hallows (disambiguation)
 "For All the Saints", Christian hymn
 For All the Saints: A Prayer Book for and by the Church, Lutheran breviary